St Michael's Church is in St Michael's Road, Ditton, Widnes, Halton, Cheshire, England. It is recorded in the National Heritage List for England as a designated Grade II* listed building. It is an active Roman Catholic church.

History
The church was founded when German Jesuits expelled from their own country (1872) settled in Ditton. They were victims of Bismark Kulturkampf which tried to reduce the influence of Catholicism in Germany. The Jesuit students of Theology formed a community at Ditton Hall and between 1876 and 1879 built the church. It was designed by Henry Clutton. The cost of the church, £16,000 (equivalent to £ in ), was met by Lady Mary Stapleton-Bretherton of Ditton Hall. In 1979 the interior of the church was reordered by Bartlett and Purnell.

Architecture

Exterior
The church is built in red ashlar sandstone with a slate roof. Its plan is cruciform, with short transepts and a west tower. It has an eight-bay arcade which takes in the nave and the chancel. The tower is in three stages with a steep saddleback roof. The entrance to the church is through the west door of the tower, above which are three lancet windows. Above these are three-light louvred bell openings and a balustrade. The windows in the gables of the chancel and transepts are rose windows containing stained-glass. Elsewhere, the windows are lancets. At the east end are two lancets separated by a large shaft.

Interior
The ceiling is barrel vaulted, boarded with hardwood, running through the nave and chancel. In the north transept is an organ and confessionals are in the south transept. The chancel has a yellow sandstone wall and a marble floor; the walls of the nave are plastered. The altar and lectern are made from Clipsham stone, and the stained-glass comes from Cologne. The organ was built in 1879 by Gray & Davison.

See also

 Grade I and II* listed buildings in Halton (borough)
 List of Jesuit sites
 Listed buildings in Widnes
 Mary Stapleton-Bretherton

References

Roman Catholic churches in Cheshire
Grade II* listed churches in Cheshire
Roman Catholic churches completed in 1879
Gothic Revival church buildings in England
Gothic Revival architecture in Cheshire
Buildings and structures in Widnes
19th-century Roman Catholic church buildings in the United Kingdom
Roman Catholic Archdiocese of Liverpool
Henry Clutton buildings